Villa Maipú is a localidad (district) of the General San Martín Partido in Buenos Aires Province, Argentina. It forms part of the urban agglomeration of Greater Buenos Aires.

The localidad is home to Chacarita Juniors, a football club that won the 1969 Metropolitano.

External links

Populated places in Buenos Aires Province
General San Martín Partido